Romana Fútbol Club was a football team based in La Romana, Dominican Republic that played until 2014 in the defunct Primera División de Republica Dominicana.

The team disappeared in 2014 following the professionalization of the Dominican football. A new club was created in La Romana that year, called Delfines del Este FC that from 2015 competes in the Liga Dominicana de Fútbol.

Stadium
The team played at the 3000 capacity Complejo Deportivo La Romana.

Last staff
Head Coach:  Claudio Parrella
Assistant Coach:  Gustavo Gimondo
Physical trainer:  Juan Alberto Reyes
Goalkeeper trainer:  Robert Gomez

External links

Football clubs in the Dominican Republic
Association football clubs disestablished in 2014